Žedno is a village in the Čiovo island, near Split, Croatia.  It is situated on the top of Čiovo island.

The village has a church and a kindergarten, but no school. Administratively, it is part of the city of Trogir.

It is connected by road to nearby villages of Mastrinka and Okrug Gornji.

References 

Populated places in Split-Dalmatia County